Nuclear Dream is a collection of various works by Sergei Lukyanenko, published in 2002. Most of the short stories were previously published individually, either online on in various literary magazines. Along with other things, it includes the novel Nuclear Dream.

Novels

 Transparent Stained-Glass Windows
 Nuclear Dream

Short stories

From Fate

 Evening Conversation with Mister Special Ambassador
 From Fate
 Footsteps Behind Your Back
 Negotiators
 Ahaulya Lyalyapta

Time Spiral

 A Talk Between Men
 Time Spiral
 Professional
 Coincidence
 Very Important Cargo

Miscellaneous Work

Articles

 World of Moving Pictures
 History of Illnesses or Games That Play People

Scripts

This section contains the initial draft of the scripts for the Night Watch film adaptation that were written during the period when the novel was supposed to be adapted into a made-for-TV mini-series.

Pranks

 Koblandy-batyr and Barsa-Kelmes - chronicles a prank the author and his friends pulled up in college and what happened when a legitimate magazine treated it as a real thing. 
 Argentum Key

Novels by Sergey Lukyanenko
2002 short story collections
21st-century Russian novels